The Chirkey Dam (Chirkeisk GES) is an arch dam on the Sulak River in Dagestan, Russia. The main purpose of the dam is hydroelectric power production, and it supports a 1,000 MW power station. Construction on the dam began in 1964, the first generator was operational by 1974, the last in 1976 while the project was officially completed in 1978. It is the tallest arch dam in Russia.

Design

The dam's power station contains 4 × 250 MW Francis turbine-generators for a total installed capacity of 1,000 MW. Each generator is supplied with water by a penstock, all four of which intake on the upstream side of the dam's face and run down its surface toward the power station at the dam's base.

See also

List of power stations in Russia

References

External links
 Photos of the dam at EnglishRussia.com

Hydroelectric power stations built in the Soviet Union
Hydroelectric power stations in Russia
Dams in Russia
Arch dams
Dams completed in 1978
Caspian Sea basin